The 2016 Barcelona Open Banc Sabadell (also known as the Torneo Godó) was a men's tennis tournament played on outdoor clay courts. It was the 64th edition of the event and part of the ATP World Tour 500 series of the 2016 ATP World Tour. It took place at the Real Club de Tenis Barcelona in Barcelona, Catalonia, Spain, from April 18 through April 24, 2016.

Points and prize money

Points distribution

Prize money

Singles main-draw entrants

Seeds

1 Rankings as of April 11, 2016.

Other entrants
The following players received wildcards into the main draw:
  Albert Montañés
  Jaume Munar
  Benoît Paire
  Elias Ymer

The following players received entry from the qualifying draw:
  Pedro Cachín
  Márton Fucsovics
  Karen Khachanov
  Franko Škugor
  Radek Štěpánek
  Jan-Lennard Struff

The following players received entry as a lucky loser:
  Renzo Olivo
  Édouard Roger-Vasselin

Withdrawals
Before the tournament
  Kevin Anderson →replaced by  Santiago Giraldo
  Pablo Andújar →replaced by  Mikhail Kukushkin
  David Ferrer →replaced by  Édouard Roger-Vasselin
  Richard Gasquet →replaced by  Renzo Olivo
  Martin Kližan →replaced by  Thiemo de Bakker
  Leonardo Mayer →replaced by  Marcel Granollers
  Tommy Robredo →replaced by  Facundo Bagnis

Doubles main-draw entrants

Seeds

 Rankings are as of April 11, 2016.

Other entrants
The following pairs received wildcards into the doubles main draw:
  Pablo Carreño Busta /  David Marrero
  Pablo Cuevas /  Marcel Granollers

The following pair received entry from the qualifying draw:
  Oliver Marach /  Fabrice Martin

Champions

Singles

  Rafael Nadal def.  Kei Nishikori, 6–4, 7–5

Doubles

  Bob Bryan /  Mike Bryan def.  Pablo Cuevas /  Marcel Granollers, 7–5, 7–5.

References

External links
Official website

Barcelona Open Banc Sabadell
Barcelona Open (tennis)
Barcelona Open Banco Sabadell